The Naha Helicopter Airlift Squadron also known as the Naha Helicopter Transport Squadron is a unit of the Japan Air Self-Defense Force. It comes under the authority of the Air Rescue Wing. It is based at Naha Air Base in Okinawa Prefecture. It is equipped with CH-47J aircraft.

History
On March 7, 2018 on a training flight over Okinoerabujima in Kagoshima Prefecture, the rear cargo door of a CH-47J of the Air Rescue Wing fell off. The aircraft was doing take-off and landing drills. No injuries were reported.

Tail marking
As with other helicopter airlift squadrons, it has the emblem of the Air Rescue Wing with a sticker stating the home base of the unit.

Aircraft operated
 CH-47J

References

Units of the Japan Air Self-Defense Force